Terhemba Shija is a Nigerian academic, poet, novelist, critic  and politician who, as of 2014, lectures at the Nasarawa State University, Keffi.

Shija served as a Member of the House of Representatives of Nigeria in 1992 Benue state.

He also served as Commissioner of Local Government and Chieftaincy Affairs Benue State, during the administration of Governor George Akume, resigning in December 2002;
He is the author of several books   of fiction, biography, literary criticism and poetry. His best known titles are "Whispers of Distant Drums" "The Siege, The Saga" and "Cantos for the Benue".

References 

1960 births
Living people
Nigerian politicians
People from Benue State
Nigerian poets